Berborite is a beryllium borate mineral with the chemical formula Be2(BO3)(OH,F)·(H2O). It is colorless and leaves a white streak. Its crystals are hexagonal to pyramidal. It is transparent and has vitreous luster. It is not radioactive. Berborite is rated 3 on the Mohs Scale.

Berborite occurs in 1T, 2T, 2H polytypes.

It was first described in 1967 for an occurrence in the Lupikko Mine, Ladoga Region Karelia Republic, Russia. It has also been reported from Tvedalen, Larvik, Vestfold, and Siktesøya Island, Langesundsfjord, Porsgrunn, Telemark, Norway.  It occurs in serpentine altered dolomite in association with skarn enriched in tungsten, strontium, beryllium and boron in the Keralia occurrence and in vugs with natrolite and thomsonite in Norway.

References

Beryllium minerals
Borate minerals
Trigonal minerals
Minerals in space group 143
Minerals in space group 158
Hexagonal minerals
Minerals in space group 173